Mayall's Object (also classified under the Atlas of Peculiar Galaxies as Arp 148) is the result of two colliding galaxies located 500 million light years away within the constellation of Ursa Major. It was discovered by American astronomer Nicholas U. Mayall of the Lick Observatory on 13 March 1940, using the Crossley reflector. When first discovered, Mayall's Object was described as a peculiar nebula, shaped like a question mark. Originally theorized to represent a galaxy reacting with the intergalactic medium, it is now thought to represent the collision of two galaxies, resulting in a new object consisting of a ring-shaped galaxy with a tail emerging from it. It is thought that the collision between the two galaxies created a shockwave that initially drew matter into the center which then formed the ring.

Arp 148 was imaged by the Hubble Space Telescope as part of a survey of what are thought to be colliding galaxies. The image was taken with Wide Field and Planetary Camera 2 instrument. It was released along with 59 other images of this type in 2008 for that space telescopes' 18th anniversary.

See also
Ring galaxy
Interacting galaxy
Irregular galaxy
Peculiar galaxy
Mayall II
NGC 2207 and IC 2163
Andromeda–Milky Way collision
List of Hubble anniversary images

References

Ursa Major (constellation)
Interacting galaxies
148
Ring galaxies
Luminous infrared galaxies
Astronomical objects discovered in 1940